The Cotswold is a British breed of domestic sheep. It originates in, and is named for, the Cotswold hills of the southern midlands of England. It is a large long-woollen sheep, and is kept as a dual-purpose breed, providing both meat and wool.

It is a rare breed: in 2021 it was listed as "at risk" on the watchlist of the Rare Breeds Survival Trust.

History 

Cotswold sheep have been noted as commonly having a slightly golden coloured wool since the days of Drayton and Camden in England (circa late 16th century to early 17th century), with dark colours being exceedingly rare.  This trait gave them the nickname of the "Golden Fleece Breed".

In the Middle Ages, Cotswold wool was highly prized and sought-after across Europe for its golden sheen and wealthy English merchants who profited from the wool trade funded the construction of many impressive wool churches which stand in the Cotswolds to this day.

Some old-time black "Cotswolds" historically hark back in some form or another to crosses like those originally noted in the flock of William Large of the early 19th century in England.  Those sheep were the product of extensive crossing with English Leicesters, a breed more often known for possessing coloured wool.

In 2009 it was classified on the watchlist of the Rare Breeds Survival Trust as "minority", the lowest of five levels of concern; in 2021 it was one of twenty-four breeds listed as "at risk".

Roman
In July 1964 a Roman-sculpted replica of a sheep's head was described as having been unearthed near Bibury Church in Gloucestershire, England.  A photo of this sculpture is on page 6 of the booklet The Cotswold Sheep.  The resemblance to modern Cotswold sheep is striking.

Some authorities claim (Elwes, 1893) the Cotswold breed was already in the Cotswold Hills when the Romans got there circa 54 B.C. Others believe that the Cotswold descended from the breeding of local sheep with imported long wool breeds brought with the Romans.

United States
By 1831, this breed had been introduced to the United States by Christopher Dunn of near Albany, New York.  Importation records of Cotswold only date back to that era. 

While Christopher Dunn imported only one Cotswold ram to cross with his English Leicester ewes.  The resulting crosses were so impressive that they prompted William Henry Sotham (funded by the Hon. Erastus Corning, also of Albany) to make extensive imports of Cotswold sheep from the flock of William Hewer of Northleach, Gloucestershire, England.

Another early contributor to American flocks was the Charles Barton Flock, of Fyfield, Northleach, England, whose owner had family records of Cotswold pedigrees going back to 1640 or before.

Like other longwool breeds, the Cotswold was often used for crossbreeding in early times.  By 1914 over 760,000 had been recorded in the US and Canada by the American Cotswold Record Association.  The breed was seen as a way of adding staple length to other breeds while not reducing the size of the carcase or thickness of wool.

The main reason for its early popularity over other lustre longwools in the USA was because it did not require "high feeding" (in other words, large amounts of grain) in order to make good growth.

According to Sheep! magazine editor Nathan Griffith's book on the breed, the largest recorded representative of the Cotswold breed in America was Broadfield's Pride, owned by Charles Mattocks during the 1870s.

Black Cotswold
In 1989, the Black Cotswold was recognised as a separate breed in the USA.  In that year the Black Cotswold Society was formed to assist farmers in propagating the breed. The Black Cotswold can be any colour, including white if it is related to black sheep. The Black Cotswold is not recognised or bred in the UK.  In over 130 years of registering Cotswold sheep, no sheep registered with the American Cotswold Record Association has descended from coloured ancestors.

Characteristics 

The Cotswold is a large tall sheep. It is polled in both sexes. The legs and face are without wool and are usually white; it has a pronounced forelock.

Use 

The Cotswold is reared both for wool and for meat. Lambs are commonly slaughtered at some four months old, when they may weigh .

See also
Sheep shearing

References

External links
Cotswold Sheep Society in the UK
Cotswold Breeders Association in North America
American Cotswold Record Assn. in North America
Black Cotswold Society worldwide

Sheep breeds
Sheep breeds originating in England
Cotswolds
Animal breeds on the RBST Watchlist